The Sookmyung Gayageum Orchestra is a musical ensemble from South Korea. It was formed in 1999 by music students at Sookmyung Women's University. The ensemble comprises up to 24 gayageum, often accompanied by Korean and Western percussion instruments. The group is often led by a conductor, and its performances sometimes features soloists on instruments such as the haegeum, as well as a cappella groups and breakdance groups such as Last For One.

The group performs music ranging from interpretations of ancient cheongak repertoire, to contemporary compositions by Korean composers, arrangements of Russian, South American, and Japanese folk songs, and arrangements of Beatles songs and Western classical works such as the Pachelbel Canon.

The Sookmyung Gayageum Orchestra has released 12 CDs.

Discography 
 2000 - Sookmyung Gayageum Orchestra
 2001 - Gayasong
 2003 - Let it be
 2005 - Oriental Move Of Gayageum
 2006 - Lovely Gayageum
 2006 - For You (Best Collection)
 2007 - Singing & Dancing (Single)
 2007 - Nobody know Tears (Single)
 2011 - Water Garden
 2012 - Sweet yawning
 2012 - Lovely Christmas (EP)
 2017 - Nostalgia

External links 
 Official website
 Profile

South Korean orchestras
Musical groups established in 1999
1999 establishments in South Korea